The Hôtel de Ville (City Hall) in Tours, France houses the city's offices.  The building, ornate inside and out, was designed by Tours native architect Victor Laloux and completed in 1904.

Exterior  

The Renaissance Revival main structure, facing the small semicircular green space of the Place Jean-Jaurès, was designed by Victor Laloux and built between 1896 and 1904.  Laloux, a native of the city and an accomplished professor based in Paris, also designed the city's Basilica of Saint Martin, Tours, which was begun in 1886 and completed in 1925; and the passenger building of the Tours station, completed 1896-1898.

One reviewer pointed out that the classical details were larger and placed more conspicuously, relative to the work of other modern (1910) French masters, with results that reflected the architect's individuality. "Care for the ornamental mass has been consistently kept superior to the delicate carving, resulting in an extraordinary brilliancy of classical decoration." 

Along with two large carved crests, figural sculpture forms a horizontal visual band at the base of the roof, contributed by a team of sculptors.  The two caryatids flanking the clock are Day and Night, sculpted by Emile Joseph Nestor Carlier (1849-1927).  At the base of the campanile are two lounging male figures representing the Loire and the Cher rivers, by Jean-Antoine Injalbert.  Four herms support the central balcony, sculpted by François-Léon Sicard.  The two side pavilions each carry two more allegorical figures on the sloping tops of open-bed pediments, Education and Vigilance, by Alphonse-Amédée Cordonnier, and Strength and Glory by Jean-Baptiste Hugues.  Carving on the flanking facades is limited to large versions of the Tours municipal crest, with its three castles.  

Much of the minor carving here, as with the Tours train station, came from the decorative studios of Henri Varenne, Laloux's frequent collaborator and fellow Tourangeau.

Interior 

The plan accommodates large meeting rooms and halls on the ground floor, for French civil marriage ceremonies and meetings of the city council, and are as abundantly decorated as the exterior.  The Salle des Fetes features further sculptural work by Injalbert, a figure of the Republic, and a companion figure La Touraine by Loiseau-Bailly.  Two caryatids on the mantel are credited to Henri Varenne.

An interior stone staircase houses the town's monument aux morts, with a bas-relief by sculptor Marcel Gaumont within the Escalier d'honneur.

The municipal council chamber is decorated with a triptych showing three episodes in the life of Joan of Arc, by Jean-Paul Laurens (1901-1903).

Previous city hall  

The previous Tours city hall was a four-story neo-classical building at Place Anatole-France and Rue Nationale, one of twin buildings at the landing of the town's Pont Wilson stone bridge.  It served as city hall from 1786 to 1904.  That year, the city moved to the Laloux building.  The old building became the home of the Bibliothèque municipale de Tours, of the municipal archives, and the local Ecole.  

On June 19, 1940, within a few days of the fall of Paris, a major fire caused by Nazi artillery from across the Loire burned the building to its shell, along with much of the city's historical collections.  The shell was razed the following November, leaving only a single lintel, with "Hôtel de ville" carved on one side, and "Bibliothèque" on the other.

References

External links 

Buildings and structures in Tours, France
City and town halls in France
French Renaissance Revival architecture
Monuments historiques of Indre-et-Loire